Cymbiolacca pulchra wisemani is a subspecies of large sea snail, a marine gastropod mollusc in the family volutidae, the volutes.

This species occurs in shallow water on top of the Great Barrier Reef, Queensland, Australia from at least as far north as Saint Crispins Reef Reef east of Cape Tribulation to at least as far south as Stanley Reef north east of Bowen.

This subspecies is closely related to, and may be conspecific with, Cymbiolacca pulchra peristicta from the Swain Reefs region at the southern end of the Great Barrier Reef.

The shell shape and colour pattern vary from population to population, with many endemic colour forms known.

References 

"The "pulchra complex" " Bail P.& Limpus A., Evolver, Rome 1998 

Volutidae
Gastropods described in 1870